The June Democratic Struggle, also known as the June Democracy Movement and June Democratic Uprising, was a nationwide pro-democracy movement in South Korea that generated mass protests from June 10 to 29, 1987.  The demonstrations forced the ruling government to hold elections and institute other democratic reforms, which led to the establishment of the Sixth Republic, the present-day government of South Korea.

On June 10, the military regime of President Chun Doo-hwan announced its choice of Roh Tae-woo as the next president. The public designation of Chun's successor was seen as a final affront to a delayed and deferred process to revise the South Korean constitution to permit direct election of the President. Although pressure on the regime, in the form of demonstrations by students and other groups, had been building for some time, the announcement finally triggered massive and effective protests.

Unwilling to resort to violence before the 1988 Olympic Games at Seoul (which garnered large worldwide attention), and (correctly) believing that Roh could win competitive elections anyway given divisions within the opposition, Chun and Roh acceded to the key demands of direct presidential elections and restoration of civil liberties.  Although Roh was duly elected as president that December with a bare plurality, the democratic consolidation of South Korea was fully underway.

Background

Indirect presidential elections
Since the 1972 implementation of the Yushin Constitution by then-president Park Chung-hee, South Korean presidents were elected indirectly by the National Conference for Unification, an electoral college. This system persisted even after Park was assassinated and then replaced by Choi Kyu-hah, who was himself replaced by Chun after the Coup d'état of December Twelfth. Since the college was generally hand picked by the regime itself, it did not represent any sort of democratic check on presidential power.

Seeking to enhance his domestic and international standing by providing a veneer of democratic representation, Chun held elections in 1985. The result was a major moral victory for the opposition, led by Kim Dae-jung and Kim Young-sam. The opposition's key demand was direct presidential elections, and Chun sought to foil this by initiating a campaign of delay, deliberation, and deferment. A parliamentary committee debated various proposals for months; on April 13, 1987, Chun suspended even this committee until after the Olympics. This action intensified unrest, but resulting demonstrations did not impress the regime and Chun decided to continue his program to install Roh as his successor.

Throughout this period, the labor movement, university students, and churches in particular joined in a mutually supporting alliance to put increasing pressure on the regime. This mobilized a portion of civil society, in addition to the political opposition, formed the core of the resistance that would become generalized during the decisive events of June.

Torture and death of Park Jong-cheol 

In the 1980s, many student activists in universities struggled against Chun Doo-hwan's dictatorship in the aftermath of the 1980 Gwangju Massacre. Park Jong-chol, the president of the student council in the linguistics department of Seoul National University, was one of those students.  Detained during an investigation into such activities, Park refused to confess the whereabouts of one of his fellow activists. During the interrogation, authorities used waterboarding techniques to torture him, eventually leading to his death on January 14, 1987.

Information surrounding the events of Park Jong-chol's death was initially suppressed. However, the Catholic Priests Association for Justice (CPAJ), revealed the truth to the public on May 18, further inflaming public sentiment. CPAJ planned a June 10 demonstration in his honor.

Death of Lee Han-yeol 
As demonstrations intensified, students in Yonsei University swore to take the field and demonstrated at the university on June 9. During the protest, Yonsei student Lee Han-yeol was seriously injured when a tear gas grenade penetrated his skull.  In critical condition, he quickly became a symbol of the subsequent protests over the weeks that followed.  He finally died of his wounds on July 5, after the regime had agreed to the people's demands.  Over 1.6 million citizens participated in his national funeral, held on July 9. He was buried at May 18th National Cemetery.

Main demonstrations
The 1980 constitution limited the president to a single seven-year term. Unlike his predecessors, Chun made no effort to amend the document in order to allow him to run again in 1987. However, while his rule was somewhat milder than that of Park, he resisted calls to further open up the regime.

On June 10, Roh Tae-woo was nominated as a candidate for the presidency at a Democratic Justice Party convention at Jamsil Arena.  Major demonstrations occurred throughout the country, with an estimated 240,000 people participating in 22 cities including Seoul. Many people of all social standings joined and supported participants.

On June 18, the National rally for banishment of tear gas grenades (최루탄추방국민대회/催淚彈追放國民大會) brought 1.5 million people into the streets across at least 16 cities.  Finally, the white collar workers who had before remained on the sidelines joined protests, throwing rolls of toilet paper, applauding and otherwise voicing their support.  On June 19, Chun issued orders to mobilize the army, but fearing a reprise of the violent Gwangju Massacre, he rescinded them within hours.  On June 26, the Great National March of Peace (국민평화대행진/國民平和大行進) was held by Guk-bon (National Movement Headquarters for the Gain of Democratic Constitution - 민주헌법쟁취국민운동본부/民主憲法爭取國民運動本部); over 1 million people in 34 cities participated and 3,467 people were detained.

Eventually, Roh Tae-woo issued the June 29 Declaration, capitulating to the demands of the protesters by promising to amend the Constitution and to release Kim Dae-jung.

Aftermath

1987 Great Labor Action
Following the June Democratic Uprising, Hyundai Engine Trade Union was established in Ulsan on July 5. Many workers across the country started to establish labor unions and take actions to demand better conditions such as strikes and walkouts. Within the space of a year, 4,000 new unions representing some 700,000 workers were established, and union membership would increase from 1.06 million in 1986 to 1.98 million in 1990. Daewoo worker Lee Suk-kyu was killed after being hit by a tear gas canister on August 22, and Hyundai workers occupied Ulsan City Hall on September 2. On September 29, the government announced it would take steps to make workers "middle class". A total of 3,492 labor disputes were recorded by the government between June 29 and September 15, with an average of 44 industrial actions being undertaken per day in this period.

The 9th amendment of Constitution

After the 6.29 Declaration, amendment of the Constitution finally began in earnest. On October 12 the constitutional bill was passed, and on October 28 it was approved. It officially took effect on February 25, 1988, when Roh Tae-woo was inaugurated as president.

The 10th Constitution strengthened civil rights. Natural and legal rights were explicitly specified, direct presidential elections were implemented, and the power of the president was reduced in favor of the power of National Assembly of Korea.

The first democratic election in South Korea

Roh retained his June 10 nomination as a candidate for the presidency of Democratic Justice Party, and he remained Chun's chosen successor.  Roh had enough legitimate support within the Korean electorate to compete in the elections in December 1987.  His position was greatly improved by the divisions within the opposition, as Kim Dae-jung and Kim Young-sam were unable to unite, or even back a two-tier voting system that would create a runoff.

Two weeks before the presidential election, Korean Air Flight 858 exploded when it was flying to Bangkok. The revelation of the North Korean conspiracy against the plane, and the arrival in Seoul of Kim Hyon Hui, one of the agents responsible for the attack, the day before the election created a profitable environment for Roh Tae-woo.

The election finally took place on December 16. In the end Roh Tae-woo was the winner, receiving 36.6% of the vote on turnout of 89.2%.  The opposition vote was split in two, with Kim Young-sam receiving 28% and Kim Dae-jung 27% of the vote.  This election marked the beginning of the Sixth Republic.

In popular culture
The 2014 videogame Wargame: Red Dragon features an alternative history campaign based on the June Struggle. In this campaign, the player must defend against North Korean forces, which have taken advantage of the destabilized South to invade.

The 2017 film 1987: When the Day Comes, directed by Jang Joon-hwan, depicts how the death of student activist Park Jong-chol sparked nationwide pro-democracy protests that changed the course of Korean history in June 1987.

See also
Bu-Ma Democratic Protests
History of South Korea
Fifth Republic of South Korea
Sixth Republic of South Korea
Gwangju Uprising
Tiananmen Square protests of 1989
Seoul Spring

References

External links 
 Photographs of July 9, 1987 funeral procession for Yi Han-yeol, Seoul
Fifth Republic of Korea
Protests in South Korea
History of South Korea
Political history of South Korea
20th-century revolutions
1987 protests
1987 in South Korea
South Korean democracy movements
Civil disobedience